Happy is a 2011 documentary film directed, written, and co-produced by Roko Belic. It explores human happiness through interviews with people from all walks of life in 14 different countries, weaving in the newest findings of positive psychology.

Synopsis
Roko Belic was inspired to create the film after producer/director Tom Shadyac showed him an article in The New York Times titled "A New Measure of Well Being from a Happy Little Kingdom". The article ranks the United States as the 23rd-happiest country in the world. Shadyac then suggested that Belic make a documentary about happiness. Belic spent several years interviewing hundreds of people, from leading happiness researchers to a rickshaw driver in Kolkatta, a family living in a cohousing community in Denmark, a woman who was run over by a truck, a Cajun fisherman, and more.

Production
Roko and his brother Adrian Belic shot the film on three Sony Z1U HDV video cameras. They interviewed a number of psychologists around the world, including Ed Diener, a professor of psychology at the University of Illinois; Richard Davidson, a professor at the University of Wisconsin's Lab of Affective Neuroscience; and Sonja Lyubomirsky, professor at the University of California, Riverside and author of The How of Happiness.

Post-production
Vivien Hillgrove edited the film. Belic received the majority of the budget from Tom Shadyac to complete principal photography and post-production. The filmmakers then turned to crowdsource fundraising website Kickstarter to raise the finishing funds for the film. The Kickstarter campaign raised $36,000 in July 2010.

See also
 Project Happiness
 Genghis Blues

References

External links
 
 

2011 films
2011 documentary films
Documentary films about mental health
Positive psychology
Kickstarter-funded documentaries
Films shot in Kolkata
Happiness
Films directed by Roko Belic
2010s English-language films